Børge Mortensen (3 November 1921 – 16 October 2005) was a Danish cyclist. He competed in the team pursuit event at the 1948 Summer Olympics.

References

1921 births
2005 deaths
Danish male cyclists
Olympic cyclists of Denmark
Cyclists at the 1948 Summer Olympics
Sportspeople from Aarhus